Camp Hill is a summit in Harpers Ferry, West Virginia, in the United States.

Camp Hill was so named from the fact army men camped there in 1799.

References

Mountains of Jefferson County, West Virginia
Mountains of West Virginia